Katharina Schroth was born (February 22, 1894 – February 19, 1985) in Dresden, Germany with scoliosis. Her treatment path was to wear thoracic braces to try to fix her diagnosis. She was sick of wearing the braces and over her lifetime found ways to use breathing techniques and different manipulation processes using pulley systems and different stretches to fix the scoliosis. She had started two different institutes that taught and used these techniques to other individuals who also had scoliosis. The first was in opened in 1921 and was called Breathing Orthopedics and was in Meissen Germany. The second institute opened was in Sobernheim. The techniques used are now known as the Schroth Method and are still implemented today. The Schroth method helped to change the way of healing scoliosis and set the precedent for how other techniques were developed. For this work, Schroth was awarded the Federal Cross of Merit by the Federal Republic of Germany. These institutes were passed down to her daughter, Christa Lehnert-Schroth, and to her daughter’s son, Dr. Hans-Rudolf Weiss, MD. Her grandson is still alive and has his own practice of where he uses modifications of his grandmother’s techniques to help those with scoliosis today.

Personal life

Early life 
Katharina Schroth was born February 22, 1894, in Dresden, Germany with medium to moderate scoliosis. In order to treat her scoliosis, she was given a steel brace to wear daily. At the age of 16, her dislike for this steel brace led her to seek out a different alternative to help treat and cure herself of her scoliosis. She first used mirrors to try to determine the best route of success. With the inspiration of a balloon, she looked at the deformities and asymmetrical aspect of her torso and tried to manipulate the differences by overcorrecting them through breathing and watching her body move in the mirror. Once she had found different ways of how the body functions with the different breathing patterns that she had tried, she began to look for ways to physically manipulate her body to correct the deformities. She did this by developing a pulley system to manipulate her torso, while she once again watched in the mirror.

Early Careers 
Katharina Schroth had been a teacher at a Rackow’s school of business and Languages in Dresden. It is said that she was able to correct those spinal deformities enough that different teachers at the school began noticing and telling her that they saw a difference. She eventually left this field and turned to functional gymnastics. Here she used her different functional knowledge from gymnastics and applied a lot of Swedish gymnastics elements to her different techniques to try to improve her own spinal deformities. She was later asked to begin presenting lectures on this topic and she prepared for these by examining the anatomy and having medical practitioners test her knowledge. Soon after this she opened her first therapy institute in 1921.

Family 
Katharina Schroth was married to Franz Schroth. They had a daughter, who was named Christa. Christa was a physiotherapist and took over her mother’s work. She also had a son named Hans-Rudolf Weiss. He became a physician and also furthered his grandmother’s work and is continuing to do this today in his own clinic.

Life’s work

The Schroth Method 
Katharina Schroth developed and critiqued her techniques for scoliosis correction until she could get them just right. She did this from a young age of 16 and used everything in her life from a balloon to her work as a gymnastics coach to improve her technique. This technique became known as the Schroth Method. It is a non-invasive technique that stops and prevents scoliosis from becoming worse and actually corrects it. The most important aspect of this technique is that it is individual based and unique to each person since no two cases of scoliosis are the same.

The Schroth Method included the ideals of de-rotating, elongating, and stabilizing the spine in a three-dimensional plane of sagittal, frontal and transverse. This foundations of the Schroth method looked at muscular symmetry, rotational angular breathing, and awareness of posture through stretching and exercising certain muscles. The concept of awareness of posture was illustrated by her observing herself in the mirror. She used this mirror to see how her body was oriented to try to compete against those different irregularities by overcompensating for them in posture throughout the day. Being mindful about this concept on the daily is a huge part of the Schroth method. Second, she looked at the ideas of rotational angular breathing. This idea was drawn up through the balloon or ball analogy that allowed her to see that when parts of the spine or ribs are concaved that breathing in certain ways allowed for those areas to appear straight and symmetrical. This would allow the body to stretch out the way that it was supposed to and to see different muscles that were lacking in strength. This brings us to the last concept of muscular symmetry. Through exercise and stretching, a person can fix the asymmetrical aspects of their spinal curvatures by helping inadequacies in muscle development to support the spine and fix those irregularities. This would also allow for certain overworked muscles to relax and to result in even better symmetry in both muscle strength and conformity. The Schroth method was a pivotal technique in the world of healing and has changed so many lives and the ways that different therapies were developed.

Opening institutions 
Once Katharina created a process that helped reverse and halt the spinal deformities, she opened her own institution. She opened Breathing Orthopedics in 1921 in Meissen. This location had a small building and a garden with different tools and structures that were used for individual and group treatments. They would perform a lot of their techniques like the breathing techniques outside in the garden so that their skin could feel the sun’s heat and that they could get some fresh air. Her husband, Franz Schroth would help individual patients at the institution with certain corrections and with specific strength exercises. This institution worked on specific postural correction through correctional breathing patterns and correctional postural perceptions. This method would have a 3-month rehabilitation time period. While the institution was advancing her daughter, Christa Schroth, helped with the spinal corrections within the years 1930s and 1940s.

In 1955 after World War 2, Katharina and her family moved to western Germany and in 1961 she founded her second therapy institute in Sobernheim which was to treat individuals from all over Germany and internationally. Katharina’s daughter Christa eventually became the institute’s director and worked there until she retired in 1995. This institute was quite small but over the years has grown and still is functioning and helps about 180 people with scoliosis or kyphosis. Patients were on average treated within a 6-week period. This institute was later named Katharina Schroth Klinik within the 1980s. Along with this, the first prospective controlled trail was carried out from 1989 to 1991. This clinic has since changed and now uses braces as its first treatment, but they use derivative’s Katharina’s original techniques of specific postural correction, correction of breathing patterns, and correction of postural perception for rehabilitation.

Awards 
Through all the hard work of opening two institutions and creating an innovative process of treating people with scoliosis, Katharina Schroth was awarded the Federal Cross of Merit from the Government of the Federal Republic of Germany.

References

Further reading

Publications

External links 
 
 
 
 

1894 births
1985 deaths